Agustín Ojeda (9 September 1898 – 16 November 1938) was a Mexican footballer. He competed in the men's tournament at the 1928 Summer Olympics.

References

External links
 

1898 births
1938 deaths
Mexican footballers
Mexico international footballers
Olympic footballers of Mexico
Footballers at the 1928 Summer Olympics
Place of birth missing
Association football defenders
Club América footballers